These are the complete results of the 2015 European Team Championships Super League on 20 and 21 June 2015 in Cheboksary, Russia. As with the previous championships there were a couple of rules applying specifically to this competition, such as the limit of three attempts in the throwing events, long jump and triple jump (only the top four were allowed the fourth attempt) and the limit of four misses total in the high jump and pole vault.

Final standings

Men

100 metres
Wind:Heat 1: -3.4 m/sHeat 2: -1.7 m/s

200 metres

Wind:Heat 1:  m/sHeat 2:  m/s

400 metres

800 metres

1500 metres

3000 metres

5000 metres

3000 metres steeplechase

110 metres hurdles

Wind:Heat 1:  m/sHeat 2:  m/s

400 metres hurdles

4 × 100 metres relay

4 × 400 metres relay

High jump

Pole vault

Long jump

Triple jump

Shot put

Discus throw

Hammer throw

Javelin throw

Women

100 metres
Wind:Heat 1: -4,3 m/sHeat 2: -1,4 m/s

200 metres

Wind:Heat 1:  m/sHeat 2:  m/s

400 metres

800 metres

1500 metres

3000 metres

5000 metres

3000 metres steeplechase

100 metres hurdles

Wind:Heat 1:  m/sHeat 2:  m/s

400 metres hurdles

4 × 100 metres relay

4 × 400 metres relay

High jump

Pole vault

Long jump

Triple jump

Shot put

Discus throw

Hammer throw

Javelin throw

References 
 Results

European Athletics Team Championships Super League
European
2015 in Russian sport
International athletics competitions hosted by Russia
Sport in Cheboksary